The 2000 CONCACAF Champions' Cup was the 36th edition of the annual international club football competition held in the CONCACAF region (North America, Central America and the Caribbean), the CONCACAF Champions' Cup. It determined that year's club champion of association football in the CONCACAF region. 

The Final Tournament was played in Los Angeles, California, and won by the Los Angeles Galaxy over Olimpia in the final match. This was also the last win by an MLS team in the CONCACAF Champions' Cup, now named the CONCACAF Champions League, until Seattle Sounders FC won the tournament in 2022.

Qualified teams

North American zone 
Major League Soccer: D.C. United - 1999 MLS Cup winner Los Angeles Galaxy - 1999 MLS Cup runner-up
Primera División de México: Pachuca - 1999 Invierno winner Toluca - 2000 Verano winner

Central American zone 
2000 UNCAF Interclub Cup: Olimpia - Central Zone final round first place Alajuelense - Central Zone final round second place Real España - Central Zone final round third place

Caribbean zone 
2000 CFU Club Championship: Joe Public - Caribbean Zone winner

Bracket

Quarterfinals

Semifinals

Third place match

Final

 LA Galaxy and Olimpia qualify for the 2001 FIFA Club World Championship.

Champion

References

CONCACAF Champions' Cup
c
c
c
c
2